The Southwestern Proving Ground Building No. 129 is a military powder magazine at 195 Hempstead County Road 279 in Oakhaven, Arkansas, northwest of the city of Hope.  It is located on property that was once part of the Southwestern Proving Ground, a major military facility during World War II whose largest portion was transformed into Hope Municipal Airport.  Building No. 129 is a single-story brick and tile structure, with two bays.  There are red steel doors located on the northeast and southwest facades.  The roof is gabled, and covered in fire-resistant asbestos sheeting, with vents at the ridge, and an elaborate lightning-protection system.  It was built in 1941 to house smokeless gunpowder, and is one of only two brick buildings from the proving ground to survive.  It is now used by a private owner for storage.

The building was listed on the National Register of Historic Places in 2009.

See also
Southwestern Proving Ground Building No. 4, located on the same property
Southwestern Proving Ground Building No. 5, located on the same property
Southwestern Proving Ground Officers Quarters Historic District
National Register of Historic Places listings in Hempstead County, Arkansas

References

Military facilities on the National Register of Historic Places in Arkansas
Military installations established in 1941
Buildings and structures in Hempstead County, Arkansas
National Register of Historic Places in Hempstead County, Arkansas
1941 establishments in Arkansas